Yanshan District is a district covering part of the southern suburbs of Guilin, Guangxi, China.

There is 1 subdistrict, 2 towns, 1 township, and 1 ethnic town in Yanshan District:

 Liangfeng Subdistrict
 Yanshan
 Zhemu
 Dabu Township
 Caoping Hui Ethnic Town

Education 
The university and Guangxi Yiqin trading Co.Ltd  organized it in July 2001.

References

County-level divisions of Guangxi
Administrative divisions of Guilin